Alien Encounters is an American science fiction anthology comic book published by FantaCo Enterprises and then Eclipse Comics. The comic debuted with FantaCo in 1981, and in 1985 was revived by Eclipse, where (starting over from issue 1) it ran for fourteen issues until 1987.

Eclipse began publishing the title soon after the cancellation of Alien Worlds, a similar science-fiction themed anthology.

Publication history
Creators who worked on the series include Ray Bradbury Stephen R. Bissette, John Bolton, Joe Chiodo, Richard Corben, Howard Cruse, Chuck Dixon, Rick Geary, Bruce Jones, Peter Ledger, David Lloyd, David Mazzucchelli, Gray Morrow, Ray Nelson, Timothy Truman, Thomas Yeates, Doug Wheeler and Mike Zeck.

Catherine Yronwode edited the series. Alien Encounters featured pulp magazine-inspired covers, and was sometimes criticized for featuring gratuitous nude scenes.

Other media
The story "Nada" by Ray Nelson and Bill Wray, from Alien Encounters #6 (April 1986), was an adaptation of the story "Eight O'Clock in the Morning" by Nelson that was the inspiration for the 1988 John Carpenter film They Live.

References

External links